AFC Fylde, a professional association football club based in Wesham in the Borough of Fylde, Lancashire, England, was founded in 1988. They were originally named Kirkham & Wesham as a result of a merger between Kirkham Town and Wesham Football Clubs. The club assumed Kirkham Town's place in Division One of the West Lancashire League for the 1988–89 season. The following season they finished bottom of the league table and were relegated to Division Two. In 1993 they were promoted back into Division One but were relegated again after a two-season spell. The club finished as runners-up in 1996 to achieve promotion after one season. Kirkham & Wesham's third spell in Division One, which was renamed Premier Division in 1998, was successful as they spent 11 seasons in the division, winning the title seven times, including the 2007 title where they were allowed to be promoted into the North West Counties Football League (NWC) in their Division Two for the 2007–08 season.

The club finished as runners-up in the division and achieved promotion to the Premier Division. Also during this season they entered the FA Vase for the first time and won the competition defeating Lowestoft Town 2–1 in the final. At the end of the season the club adopted the new name AFC Fylde. In 2009 Fylde achieved their third successive promotion by winning the North West Counties Premier Division title, they were promoted into the Northern Premier League Division One North. Fylde were unable to successfully defend the FA Vase losing 2–1 in the fourth round to Needham Market. The club were entered into the FA Cup qualifying rounds for the first time in the 2008–09 season, losing to Sheffield in the preliminary round. The 2009–10 season saw the club play in the FA Trophy for the first time and the 2010–11 season they were runners-up in the promotion play-offs. Their third season in Division One North saw them win the championship title and were promoted into the Premier Division.

The club spent two seasons in the Premier Division qualifying for the play-offs in both; in the first season play-offs they were eliminated in the semi-finals by Hednesford Town in a penalty shoot-out; in the second they defeated Worksop Town in the semi-final and Ashton United in the final on penalties to achieve promotion to the Conference North. In their first season in the Conference North they finished as runners-up in the league only two points behind champions Barrow and automatic promotion, in the play-offs they were eliminated by Guiseley in the two-legged semi-final 3–1 on aggregate. The following season the Conference North was renamed National League North. The club's third-place finish meant they qualified for their fourth consecutive play-offs, they reached the final but were runners-up to North Ferriby United. Fylde won the 2016–17 National League North title and were promoted in the National League, the highest level of the National League System and fifth-highest of the overall English football league system.

Fylde finished in seventh-place in their first National League season and qualified for their sixth play-offs tournament, this time losing to Boreham Wood in the quarter-final. In the 2018–19 season they finished in fifth-place and once again qualified for the play-offs, beating Harrogate Town in the quarter-final and Solihull Moors in the semi-final before losing to Salford City in the final. Also during this season the club reached the 2019 FA Trophy Final, their first FA Trophy final, where they played National League champions Leyton Orient and defeated them 1–0 to win the competition.

Key

Key to divisions
 WL Div 1 = West Lancashire Football League Division One
 WL Div 2 = West Lancashire Football League Division Two
 WL Premier = West Lancashire Football League Premier Division
 NWC Div 2 = North West Counties Football League Division Two
 NWC Premier = North West Counties Football League Premier Division
 NPL Div 1N = Northern Premier League Division One North
 NPL Premier = Northern Premier League Premier Division
 Conference North = Football Conference North
 National North = National League North
 National League

Key to positions and symbols
  = Champions
  = Runners-up
  = Promoted
  = Relegated

Key to rounds
PRE = Preliminary round
QR1 = First qualifying round, etc.
R1 = First round, etc.
QF = Quarter-finals
SF = Semi-finals
RU = Runners-up
W = Winners

Seasons

Notes

References

External links
 
 

Seasons
Fylde